The Gray Man (previously known as Wysteria: The Horrible Story of Albert Fish) is a 2007 biographical thriller film based on the actual life and events of American serial killer, rapist and cannibal Albert Fish. It premiered at the Montreal World Film Festival on August 31, 2007, and was scheduled for a theatrical release sometime in 2007. It is directed by Scott Flynn and stars Belgian actor Patrick Bauchau as Albert Fish.

Plot
At St. John's Orphanage in 1877, children, including a young Albert Fish, are being paddled as punishment for their sins. Albert Fish as an adult (Patrick Bauchau) then tells of a horse that some older boys at the orphanage set on fire, comparing himself to the horse. He regularly whips himself with a belt while hallucinating himself as he appeared in the orphanage. Fish kills a boy scout, Francis McDonnell, before visiting the Budd family home, where he abducts and murders ten-year-old Grace Budd (Lexi Ainsworth) on June 3, 1928, under the pretense of taking her to his niece's birthday party. Throughout the film is a film noir-style narration by Detective William King (Jack Conley), of the Missing Persons Bureau. King searches for Grace Budd for six years, before finally tracking down and arresting Fish. Fish is found guilty despite evidence of his insanity, and promptly sentenced to die.

Cast

Main
 Patrick Bauchau as Albert Fish
 Jack Conley as Det. Will King
 John Aylward as Captain Ayers
 Jillian Armenante as Delia Budd
 Silas Weir Mitchell as Albert Fish Jr.
 Vyto Ruginis as Detective Maher
 Mollie Milligan as Gertrude
 Lexi Ainsworth as Grace Budd
 Shaun Senter as Pale Boy
 Ben Hall as Albert Budd
 Shawn Jefferson as Officer MacDonald

Reception
Varietys Dennis Harvey wrote, "A chilling turn by Patrick Bauchau as Albert Fish, the seemingly harmless old gent exposed in 1934 as a serial child murderer, dominates The Gray Man. Skirting graphic horror terrain for a less sensational character study/detective-procedural, helmer Scott Flynn's debut feature manages to be just moderately compelling despite the grotesque subject. Cable and DVD sales are signaled."

References

External links

2007 films
American biographical films
Thriller films based on actual events
Films set in the 1920s
Films scored by Justin Burnett
2007 crime thriller films
2000s biographical films
American neo-noir films
American crime thriller films
American serial killer films
Crime films based on actual events
2000s serial killer films
2000s English-language films
2000s American films